Haflong Hindi is the lingua franca of Dima Hasao district of Assam state of India. It is a pidgin that stemmed from Hindustani and includes vocabulary from several other languages, such as Assamese, Dimasa and Zeme Naga. It is named after Haflong, which is the headquarters of Dima Hasao district.

Example phrases 
The dialect is largely intelligible to Hindi speakers, and features simplified grammar with loanword infusions.

In contrast to printed forms of Hindi, the Haflong variety lacks person and number agreement in the verb and ergative marking of the subject when transitive clauses are in a preterite or perfect tense.

References 

Dima Hasao district
Hindi languages
Languages of Assam
Hindustani-based pidgins and creoles